The RagWing RW9 Motor Bipe is a family of single seat, open-frame fuselage, open-cockpit, single engine ultralight aircraft designed by Roger Mann and sold as plans by RagWing Aircraft Designs for amateur construction.

Design and development
The RW9 was designed as an FAR 103 Ultralight Vehicles compliant biplane that would have an empty weight within that category's  empty weight limit. The RW9 achieves its light weight in part due to its completely open-frame tube fuselage.

The RW9's wings are constructed entirely from wood and covered with aircraft fabric. The fuselage is a fastened aluminum tube truss construction. The landing gear is of conventional configuration. The  2si 460 has also been used.

The RW9 is available only as plans and reported construction time is 150–175 hours.

The same basic airframe design was also used to produce the parasol wing RagWing RW16 Aerial.

Variants
RW9 Motor Bipe
Open-frame fuselage, open-cockpit ultralight biplane first flown in 1995 and powered by a  Kawasaki 440A or a  2si 460.
RW16 Aerial
Open-frame fuselage, open-cockpit ultralight parasol wing aircraft, powered by a  Kawasaki 340.

Specifications (RW9)

See also

References

External links
Official website - RW9
Official website - RW16

1990s United States ultralight aircraft